Pascal Delhommeau (born 14 August 1978) is a French former professional football defender.

Career
Whilst at FC Nantes Delhommeau contributed 9 appearances as his side won 2000–01 French Division 1. He also played as a substitute when Nantes won the 2001 Trophée des Champions. Whilst at Lorient Delhommeau played as a substitute in the 2002 Coupe de France Final in which they beat SC Bastia.

Delhommeau won the 1997 UEFA European Under-18 Championship with France.

References

External links
Bio at FC Metz.com

1978 births
Living people
Footballers from Nantes
Association football defenders
French footballers
France youth international footballers
FC Nantes players
FC Lorient players
FC Metz players
Ligue 1 players
Vannes OC players
Ligue 2 players